Amphimallon maevae is a species of beetle in the Melolonthinae subfamily that is endemic to Cyclades islands.

References

Beetles described in 1999
maevae